Edgar Wilson was a member of the US House of Representatives for Ohio between 1899–1903.

Edgar Wilson may also refer to:
 Edgar C. Wilson, member of the US House of Representatives for Virginia 
 Edgar Bright Wilson (politician), Speaker of the Tennessee House of Representatives 
 Edgar Bright Wilson, American chemist
 Edgar Wilson (footballer), English footballer
 Edgar Wilson (died 1976), American businessman, namesake of the Edgar Wilson Award